Mackessack or MacKessack may refer to:

People 
 Douglas Mackessack (1903–1987), Scottish cricketer, British Army officer, and whiskey distiller
 James Kessack (1879–1916), British trade unionist
 Kenneth Mackessack (1902–1982), Scottish cricketer and army officer

Places 
 Mackessack Park, Rothes, a football field in Moray, Scotland

See also 
 McKissic
 McKissack (disambiguation)
 McKissick (disambiguation)